is one of 24 wards of Osaka, Japan. It has an area of 8.88 km2, and a population of 60,085. It houses Osaka's financial district, as well as the Osaka Prefecture offices and principal shopping and tourist areas.

Consulates
Various consulates are found in Chūō-ku. The Consulate-General of South Korea has its own building. Three consulates, Consulate-General of Australia, the Consulate-General of the Netherlands, and the Consulate-General of the Philippines, occupy the twenty-ninth, thirty-third, and twenty-fourth floors, respectively, of the Twin21 MID Tower. The Consulate-General of Canada is on the twelfth floor of the Daisan Shoho Building in Chūō-ku. The Consulate-General of France is on the tenth floor of the Crystal Tower. The Consulate-General of India is on the tenth floor of the Semba I.S. Building. The Consulate-General of Indonesia is on the first floor of the Koike Bldg. The Consulate-General of Singapore is on the fourteenth floor of the Osaka Kokusai Building. The Consulate-General of Thailand is in the first, fourth, and fifth floors of the Bangkok Bank Building. The Consulate-General of the United Kingdom is on the nineteenth floor of the Seiko Osaka Building. The Consulate-General of Vietnam is on the tenth floor of the Estate Bakuro-machi Building.

Facilities

Osaka Prefecture
Osaka Prefectural Government
Osaka Prefectural Police Head Station
Minami Police Station
Higashi Police Station
Osaka Contemporary Art Center

Mass media
Broadcasting stations
NHK Osaka Broadcasting Station - Otemae
Yomiuri Telecasting Corporation - Shiromi Nichome (Osaka Business Park)
TV Osaka - Otemae
Newspapers
Nihon Keizai Shimbun - Otemae

Economy

Company headquarters
Capcom - Uchihiranomachi
Daimaru
Dainippon Sumitomo Pharma - Dojomachi
Iwatani Corporation - Hommachi
JEX Co.,Ltd. - Jekusu Kabushiki-gaisha
Kansai Paint - Imabashi
Kansai Urban Banking Corporation
Keihan Electric Railway Co., Ltd. - Otemae
Kobayashi Pharmaceutical Co., Ltd. - Dojomachi
Mandom Corporation - Junikencho
Mitsubishi Tanabe Pharma Corporation - Kitahama
Morishita Jintan Co., Ltd. - Morinomiya
Nankai Electric Railway Co., Ltd.
Nippon Life Insurance Company - Imabashi
Nippon Telegraph and Telephone West Corporation (NTT West) - Bamba
Ono Pharmaceutical - Kyutaro-machi
Osaka Gas Co., Ltd. - Hiranomachi
Osaka Exchange Inc. - Kitahama
Resona Bank - Bingomachi
Sakura Color Products Corporation - Morinomiya
Shionogi - Dojomachi
Sumitomo Chemical - Kitahama
Sumitomo Life Insurance Company - Shiromi (Osaka Business Park)
Takeda Pharmaceutical Company  - Dojomachi
Takenaka Corporation - Hommachi
Teijin - Hommachi
Unitika - Kyutaro-machi

Sumitomo Trust and Banking was headquartered in Kitahama prior to its merger to form Sumitomo Mitsui Trust Bank (now headquartered in Tokyo). Daiwa Bank and Kinki Osaka Bank were headquartered in Chuo-ku prior to their merger to form Resona Bank.

Branch offices
Fuji Fire and Marine has its Osaka offices in the ward.

Offices of foreign companies
Air China has an office on the 1st floor of the Uchihonmachi Green Building in Chūō-ku. Asiana Airlines operates a sales office on the 18th Floor of the Epson Osaka Building in Chūō-ku.

Landmarks 
 Amerikamura
 Dōtonbori
 National Bunraku Theater
 Osaka Business Park
 Osaka Castle
 Shinsaibashi

Railway stations 
West Japan Railway Company (JR West)
Osaka Loop Line: Morinomiya Station - Osakajo-koen Station
Keihan Electric Railway
Keihan Line: Yodoyabashi Station - Kitahama Station - Temmabashi Station
Kintetsu Railway
Namba Line: Osaka Namba Station - Kintetsu Nippombashi Station
Hanshin Electric Railway
Hanshin Namba Line: Osaka Namba Station
Nankai Electric Railway
Nankai Main Line: Namba Station
Osaka Metro
Midosuji Line: Yodoyabashi Station - Hommachi Station - Shinsaibashi Station - Namba Station
Tanimachi Line: Temmabashi Station - Tanimachi Yonchome Station - Tanimachi Rokuchome Station
Chuo Line: Hommachi Station - Sakaisuji-Hommachi Station - Tanimachi Yonchome Station - Morinomiya Station
Sennichimae Line: Namba Station - Nippombashi Station
Sakaisuji Line: Kitahama Station - Nagahoribashi Station
Nagahori Tsurumi-ryokuchi Line: Shinsaibashi Station - Matsuyamachi Station - Nagahoribashi Station - Tanimachi Rokuchome Station - (Tamatsukuri Station, Tennoji-ku) - Morinomiya Station - Osaka Business Park Station

Education

University and Colleges
 Osaka Dental University Temmabashi Campus
 Osaka University of Economics Kitahama Campus
 Osaka Jogakuin Junior College
 Osaka Jogakuin University
 Hannan University Yodoyabashi Satellite Campus

Secondary Education

 Private schools
Osaka Jogakuin Junior and Senior High School in

Notable people from Chūō-ku, Osaka 
Akinobu Okada, Japanese professional baseball player and manager
Isuzu Yamada, Japanese stage and screen actress
Koji Imada, Japanese musician, comedian and TV presenter
Kosuke Gomi, Japanese novelist
Kyū Sazanka, Japanese actor
Nakamura Ganjirō II, Japanese kabuki and film actor
Ōnishiki Uichirō, Japanese professional sumo wrestler
Sanjugo Naoki, Japanese novelist
Tokuzō Tanaka, Japanese film director
Toyoko Yamasaki, Japanese novelist
Yoko Akino, Japanese actress
Yusuke Hagihara, Japanese astronomer

References

External links
 
Chuo Ward Official Web Site OSAKA CITY 
大阪市 中央区 

 
Financial districts
Wards of Osaka